The Bulimia Test-Revised (BULIT-R) is a 36 item self-report questionnaire to assess the presence of bulimic symptoms. It was devised by Thelen et al. in 1991 the first version was devised by Thelen et al. in 1984. The test has been validated for use in both males and females.

Scoring

The BULIT-R contains 36 multiple choice questions with five possible responses, 28 of which factor into the total score, questions 6,11, 19, 20, 27, 29, 31 and 36 are not scored. Items 2,5,7,8,10, 12, 13, 14, 15, 16, 17, 21, 23, 26, 28, 30, 32, 35 are reversed scored. Scores range from 29–140 with those greater than 104 being indicative of bulimia nervosa.

See also
Body Attitudes Questionnaire
Eating Attitudes Test
Eating Disorder Examination Interview
Eating Disorder Inventory
SCOFF questionnaire

References

Eating disorders screening and assessment tools